This is a list of yearly Mid-Eastern Athletic Conference football standings.

MEAC standings

References

Mid-Eastern Athletic Conference
Standings
College football-related lists